BR-120 is a federal highway of Brazil. The road connects the city of Araçuaí, in the state of Minas Gerais, to the city of Arraial do Cabo, in the state of Rio de Janeiro.

References 

Federal highways in Brazil